Christian Wetklo (born 11 January 1980) is a German footballer who plays for Schalke 04 II. He made his professional debut in the Bundesliga for 1. FSV Mainz 05 on 19 February 2005, when he came on as a half time substitute in a game against Arminia Bielefeld.

Career statistics

Club

References

External links
 

1980 births
Living people
People from Marl, North Rhine-Westphalia
Sportspeople from Münster (region)
German footballers
Bundesliga players
Regionalliga players
1. FSV Mainz 05 II players
1. FSV Mainz 05 players
SV Darmstadt 98 players
Rot-Weiss Essen players
FC Schalke 04 players
Association football goalkeepers
Footballers from North Rhine-Westphalia